Assane Demoya Gnoukouri (born 28 September 1996) is an Ivorian former professional footballer who played as a midfielder. He retired in 2017 following a diagnosis with a heart condition while playing for Serie A club Udinese, on loan from Inter Milan. Gnoukouri made his Serie A debut as an 18-year-old for Inter, under then coach, Roberto Mancini.

Early career
Gnoukouri spent his early career at the Olympique de Marseille youth academy. After being released by the club in December 2013 he moved to Altovicentino. On 18 September 2014, Gnoukouri, along with his younger brother Zate Wilfried Gnoukouri and other brothers, Miguel Anguel Gnoukouri and Williams Gnoukouri, joined the Internazionale Primavera.

Club career
He made his Serie A debut for the club on 11 April 2015, coming on as a substitute for Gary Medel after 80 minutes in 3–0 win against Hellas Verona.

International career
Gnoukouri was born in Ivory Coast to Ivorian parents, but was raised in France as child before spending his late teens in Italy. He received a call up to the Ivory Coast national football team for their friendly tie against Hungary, where he was an unused substitute in a 0-0 draw. He debuted for the Ivory Coast U23s in a 5-1 loss to France U21 in November 2016.

Statistics

Club

References

External links 
 
 Assane Demoya Gnoukouri profile Goal.com

1996 births
Living people
Ivorian footballers
Ivory Coast under-20 international footballers
Inter Milan players
Footballers from Abidjan
Ivorian expatriate footballers
Ivorian expatriate sportspeople in Italy
Expatriate footballers in Italy
Serie A players
Association football midfielders
Association football defenders